Gershon Galil is Professor of Biblical Studies and Ancient History and former chair of the Department of Jewish History at  the University of Haifa, Mount Carmel, Haifa, Israel. 

Gershon Galil earned his doctorate from the Hebrew University in Jerusalem. His work, The Chronology of the Kings of Israel and Judah, suggests a new chronology for the kings of ancient Israel and ancient Judah.  His thesis was published by Brill Academic Publishers in 1996 and his chronology contrasts with those presented by the more traditional William F. Albright or Edwin R. Thiele.

Galil's studies of  ancient Near Eastern culture and history include Israel and Assyria (Hebrew; Zmora-Bitan, 2001);  The Lower Stratum Families in the Neo-Assyrian Period (BRILL, 2007) and more. He also co-edited two volumes of the Supplement to Vetus Testamentum:
Studies in Historical Geography and Biblical Historiography presented to Zecharia Kallai (with M. Weinfeld, Brill, 2000); and Homeland and Exile: Biblical and Ancient Near Eastern Studies in Honour of Bustenay Oded (with M. Geller and A. Millard, Brill, 2009).

See also
 Khirbet Qeiyafa

References

Israeli historians
Israeli non-fiction writers
Year of birth missing (living people)
Living people
Academic staff of the University of Haifa
Hebrew University of Jerusalem alumni
Historians of antiquity
Historians of Israel
Historians of Jews and Judaism